A Place in the Land is a 1998 American short documentary film directed by Charles Guggenheim with field director Judith Dwan Hallet. It was nominated for an Academy Award for Best Documentary Short.

A Place in the Land considers the history of conservation stewardship in America as reflected in the property of Billings Farm, an operating dairy farm first established in 1871, and the  Mount Tom, as well as through the work of George Perkins Marsh, Frederick Billings, and Laurance Rockefeller, who were successive residents of the estate. The documentary is shown daily at the visitor center for the Billings Farm & Museum and the Marsh-Billings-Rockefeller National Historical Park. The National Park Service and the American Memory project of the Library of Congress served as advisers to the Woodstock Foundation in the production of the film.

References

External links

1998 films
1998 documentary films
1998 short films
American independent films
American short documentary films
Documentary films about agriculture in the United States
Films directed by Charles Guggenheim
Nature conservation in the United States
1990s short documentary films
1998 independent films
1990s English-language films
1990s American films